James Robertson (born 5 May 1883) was a Scottish rugby union international who represented Scotland in the 1908 Home Nations Championship.

He played as a fly-half for Clydesdale RFC and also represented Glasgow District. He played in December 1907 inter-city match against Edinburgh District which ended as a draw.

His only international match was against England at Inverleith on 21 March 1908. Scotland won the match 16-10.

References

1883 births
Year of death missing
Scottish rugby union players
Scotland international rugby union players
Rugby union fly-halves
Glasgow District (rugby union) players
Clydesdale RFC Glasgow rugby union players